The Riverside International Speedway is an automobile racing facility at 151 Legion Road in West Memphis, Arkansas.  Its facilities consist of a  Gumbo clay oval with banked corners, bleacher seating on both straightaways.  Amenities include a concession stand.  The track was built in 1950 and opened June 10 of that year at an estimated cost of $150,000 by C L Montgomery, originally to showcase midget car racing.  It has held a World of Outlaws race. The track is nicknamed "The Ditch".

History
The track was built in 1950 as a venue for midget car racing which was popular at the time. Four area tracks were scheduled for weekly racing from Thursday to Sunday nights and Riverside was designed as the Saturday night option. The first night on June 10 had 45 midget cars entered but it rained out being rescheduled for June 17. On Thursday June 15, 1950 the first race was actually held as a stock car event. The stock cars were gaining popularity in the Mid-South and the midget cars were quickly discontinued. Joie Chitwood brought his "Thrill Show" to the track on October 1, 1950.

Notable drivers
Several World of Outlaws regular drivers who began racing at the track include Sammy Swindell, Bobby Davis Jr., and Jason Sides.

Historical place
Riverside is the oldest surviving dirt track in the Memphis area, and is listed on the National Register of Historic Places. Riverside is the oldest continuously operating track in Arkansas. It is noted for its high concentration of clay in the gumbo soil (almost 37% clay compared to more typically 22%-27%). Contributing properties include the race track, flagstand, original 1950 ticket booth (now an office), concession stand, cotton candy concession stand, and concession stand / bathroom. The facility also contains the west grandstands that were brought to the facility from Memphis-Arkansas Speedway in 2007-2008 and reconstructed. Its eastern grandstands have aluminum seating. The current wood ticket booth was built in 2008.

See also
National Register of Historic Places listings in Crittenden County, Arkansas

References

External links
Riverside International Speedway web site

Sports venues on the National Register of Historic Places in Arkansas
Buildings and structures completed in 1950
Buildings and structures in West Memphis, Arkansas
Dirt oval race tracks in the United States
Motorsport venues in Arkansas
National Register of Historic Places in Crittenden County, Arkansas
Tourist attractions in Crittenden County, Arkansas